Iwama-style Aikido  is the style of aikido that was taught in Iwama by the founder of aikido, Morihei Ueshiba, and especially the lineage passed on through Morihiro Saito, a close disciple who was given responsibility over Iwama dojo by Ueshiba.

It is also known by other names including  (see: ryū) and Iwama Aikido. It is often associated with the term  after the martial concept.

It is sometimes called Saito style, though never by Iwama stylists themselves as Saito insisted that he intended to preserve the founder's style.

Ranks
At one point Saito gave out specific  ranks at the insistence of his European students.  However, he always awarded ranks through the Aikikai (original Aikido organization) out of respect for the Ueshiba family.

Saito also gave out mokuroku (scrolls) for his aiki-ken (sword) and aiki-jo (staff) with levels loosely modeled after the traditional license system of classical Japanese martial arts to students independent of  ranks.

Today, Iwama-style aikido organisations can be found both within and outside of the Aikikai. The main non-Aikikai branch is Iwama Shin-Shin Aiki Shuren-kai, founded by Morihiro Saito's son Hitohiro Saito. It continues to issue  grading certificates; however, many of Saito's longest students have remained affiliated with the Aikikai. In Europe some of these groups belong to the Takemusu Aikido Kyokai umbrella organisation. In the United States, the major organization is the Takemusu Aikido Association

Style
Iwama practitioners often claim that their aikido is close to that of the founder, as preserved by Morihiro Saito, largely based on photos taken from the Noma Dojo and a technical manual written by the founder.

Among non-Iwama Aikikai practitioners, a common opinion is that Iwama style mainly is Morihei Ueshiba's aikido of the 1940s and 1950s not taking into consideration his later years, though Ueshiba resided in Iwama until his death there.

Pedagogy
Iwama-style aikido tends to be highly codified compared to most aikido practice. Weapons training, including kata, is stressed. Techniques are generally practiced first from a static grab and footwork is broken up into numbered steps. In addition weapons work involves many repetitions of suburi and paired weapons practice is practiced with a pause between each movement until students are relatively advanced.

A great deal of emphasis is placed on a stable hanmi or stance in Iwama-style aikido.

Several Iwama-style dojos around the world, such as Aikido in Fredericksburg, offer live-in apprentice programs ("uchi-deshi programs") modeled after Saito's program in Iwama.

Progression
Saito believed in a progression from static techniques to the spontaneous takemusu aiki.  Many Iwama-style practitioners practice in stages, most often divided into:
 (lit. the flow of ki)

Technical characteristics
In certain stances, a slight tilt of the hips is characteristic of the style. The feet are kept on a line, but the front foot points forward rather than turned out (in contrast to the Yoshinkan) causing the hips to be slightly rotated.

This is common in Yoshinkan, Manseikan, and Michio Hikitsuchi's basic practices and the founder's instruction in budo, but opposite of how many other styles of Aikido teach the techniques. Even when  is striking, it is emphasized that tori initiates the encounter. Saito referred to this as the "way of the mountain echo" (yamabiko no michi), presumably after a poem by the founder.

In keeping with the above, most grabs in Iwama aikido are formalized as a response to a threat from  unlike in most aikido styles that start attacks with a grab. As a result, Iwama-style grabs are firm and static without pushing or pulling and with the intention of immobilizing the body.

Suwari-waza in Iwama style is started completely in seiza.  This is in contrast to some other styles where the practitioners often start already on their toes (kiza).

Iwama stylists employ kiai and atemi with great consistency.

Rolls are usually performed with the rear leg tucked.

(weapons technique)
Some of the  practices were developed by Morihei Ueshiba while others are Saito's distillations of his teachings and practices.
 
Weapons practice includes suburi,  (1-step paired exercises), solo and paired kata, and tanren-uchi (striking a log or tire) with the jo and wooden sword. Though not formally part of the curriculum, Saito practiced Negishi-ryu and shuriken (throwing stars) is also sometimes practiced.

The sword forms of Iwama style are generally recognized as being descended from Kashima Shinto-ryu sword techniques. In particular the first two  are nearly identical in the sequence of cuts to forms from Kashima Shinto-ryu. It is also believed that Yagyu style had influence through Masakatsu Nakai's instruction of Ueshiba.
 

and 
, literally coarse techniques, are occasionally practiced by Iwama-style aikido practitioners.  These techniques are intended to explicitly show the injurious applications latent in aikido techniques and include simple kicks targeting the knees and entangling or twisting joints during throws with the option to break them.  Some  (modified basic techniques) in Iwama-style aikido also include entangling joints, locking large joints, strikes to vital points, and occasionally chokes using the arm or the partner's uniform (dogi).  For safety reasons these are never performed fully.

References

External links
 Iwama Takemusu Aikido Renmei France
 Iwama Shin Shin Aiki Shurenkai
 Takemusu Aikido Kyokai
 Takemusu Aikido Association (TAA)
 International Takemusu Aikido Federation (ITAF)

Aikido organizations